Qarah Tappeh (also Romanized as Qareh Tappeh; also known as Kara-Tapa, Qaratepe, and Qār Tappeh) is a village in Qareh Poshtelu-e Bala Rural District, Qareh Poshtelu District, Zanjan County, Zanjan Province, Iran. At the 2006 census, its population was 648, in 136 families.

References 

The population of this village is 499 according to the latest population figures. This is beyond the central part of Ghareh Pashtuli and is 10 km from the city of Armaghvan. The main activity of this village is agriculture. There is also a barrier near the village that feeds the surrounding gardens.

Populated places in Zanjan County